Spirotecoma is a genus of plants in the family Bignoniaceae.

Species include:
Spirotecoma apiculata (Britton) Alain
Spirotecoma holguinensis (Britton) Alain
Spirotecoma rubriflora (Leonard) Alain
Spirotecoma spiralis (C.Wright ex Griseb.) Pichon

References

 
Bignoniaceae genera
Taxonomy articles created by Polbot
Taxa named by Henri Ernest Baillon
Taxa named by Hermann Harms